Eutocius of Ascalon (480s –  520s) was a Palestinian-born Greek mathematician who wrote commentaries on several Archimedean treatises and on the Apollonian Conics.

Life and work 
Little is known about the life of Eutocius. He was born in Ascalon, then in Palestina Prima. He lived during the reign of Justinian. Eutocius probably became the head of the Alexandrian school following Ammonius, and he was succeeded in this position by Olympiodorus, possibly as early as 525. He traveled to the greatest scientific centers of his time to conduct research on Archimedes' manuscripts.

He wrote commentaries on Apollonius and on Archimedes. The surviving works of Eutocius are:
A Commentary on the first four books of the Conics of Apollonius.
Commentarieson:
the Sphere and Cylinder of Archimedes.
the Quadrature of the Circle of Archimedes (In Archimedis circuli dimensionem in Latin).
the Two Books on Equilibrium of Archimedes.
An introduction to Book I of the Almagest by Ptolemy
Historians owe much of their knowledge of Archimedes' solution of a cubic by means of intersecting conics, alluded to in The Sphere and Cylinder, to Eutocius and his commentaries. Eutocius dedicated his commentary on Apollonius' Conics to Anthemius of Tralles, also a mathematician, and architect of the Hagia Sophia patriarchal basilica in Constantinople.

References

Sources

External links

480 births
540 deaths
Ancient Greek mathematicians
Ancient Greeks from Ashkelon
6th-century mathematicians
6th-century Byzantine writers
6th-century Byzantine scientists